NGC 834 is a spiral galaxy located in the Andromeda constellation. It is estimated to be 160 million light-years away from the Milky Way galaxy and has a diameter of about 65,000 light-years. The object was discovered on September 21, 1786 by the astronomer William Herschel.

References 

Discoveries by William Herschel
Spiral galaxies
834
Galaxies discovered in 1786
Andromeda (constellation)
008352